The Symphony Xplorer V55 is an Android smartphone manufactured by Symphony Mobile. It was introduced in January, 2015.

Features 
 Network:  2G, 3G
 SIM:  Dual SIM
 Rear Camera: 5 MP
 Front Camera: 2 MP 
 Memory: 512 MB RAM
 Storage: 4 GB 
 Battery: 1700 mAh
 Size: 4.5 In
 Operating System: Android 4.4.2 KitKat
 CPU:   1.3 GHz Quad-Core
 Dimensions:  134 X 68.2 X 9.9 mm
 Sensors:  Accelerometer, Proximity, Light, G-Sensor
 Weight: 145 g 
 TFT G+F touchscreen
 Browser:  HTML

References

Android (operating system) devices
Mobile phones introduced in 2015